The 1979–80 Yugoslav First Basketball League season was the 36th season of the Yugoslav First Basketball League, the highest professional basketball league in SFR Yugoslavia.

Notable occurrences
The season saw the pro debut of fifteen-year-old Dražen Petrović. He appeared in 8 games for Šibenka throughout the season, scoring a total of 13 points. His scoring debut came on 29 December 1979 at home against OKK Beograd (Beko), a contest fifteen-year-and-two-month-old Petrović entered by coming on for Šibenka's veteran point guard Zoran Slavnić who in addition to playing also shared the team's head coaching duties with Vojislav Vezović.

Classification 

The winning roster of Bosna:
  Borislav Vučević
  Emir Mutapčić
  Predrag Benaček
  Boško Bosiočić
  Nihad Izić
  Ratko Radovanović
  Dragan Zrno
  Žarko Varajić
  Mirza Delibašić
  Sabahudin Bilalović
  Sabit Hadžić
  Miroljub Mitrović

Coach:  Bogdan Tanjević

Scoring leaders
 Branko Skroče (Zadar) - ___ points (31.8ppg)
 Dražen Dalipagić (Partizan) - ___ points (31.4ppg)

Qualification in 1980-81 season European competitions 

FIBA European Champions Cup
  Bosna (champions)

FIBA Cup Winner's Cup
  Cibona (Cup winners)

FIBA Korać Cup
  Jugoplastika (2nd)
  Partizan (4th)
  Crvena Zvezda (5th)
  Zadar (6th)

References

Yugoslav First Basketball League seasons
Yugo
Yugo